The 1954–55 NBA season was the Lakers' seventh season in the NBA.

Regular season

Season standings

x – clinched playoff spot

Record vs. opponents

Game log

Playoffs

|- align="center" bgcolor="#ccffcc"
| 1
| March 16
| Rochester
| W 82–78
| Clyde Lovellette (26)
| St. Paul Auditorium4,841
| 1–0
|- align="center" bgcolor="#ffcccc"
| 2
| March 18
| @ Rochester
| L 92–94
| Clyde Lovellette (19)
| Edgerton Park Arena
| 1–1
|- align="center" bgcolor="#ccffcc"
| 3
| March 19
| Rochester
| W 119–110
| Jim Pollard (26)
| St. Paul Auditorium4,219
| 2–1
|-

|- align="center" bgcolor="#ffcccc"
| 1
| March 20
| @ Fort Wayne
| L 79–96
| Clyde Lovellette (18)
| North Side Gymnasium
| 0–1
|- align="center" bgcolor="#ffcccc"
| 2
| March 22
| @ Fort Wayne
| L 97–98 (OT)
| Whitey Skoog (24)
| Butler Fieldhouse
| 0–2
|- align="center" bgcolor="#ccffcc"
| 3
| March 23
| Fort Wayne
| W 99–91 (OT)
| Whitey Skoog (24)
| Minneapolis Auditorium
| 1–2
|- align="center" bgcolor="#ffcccc"
| 4
| March 27
| Fort Wayne
| L 96–105
| Clyde Lovellette (25)
| Minneapolis Auditorium
| 1–3
|-

Awards and records
 Vern Mikkelsen, All-NBA Second Team
 Slater Martin, All-NBA Second Team
 Vern Mikkelsen, NBA All-Star Game
 Slater Martin, NBA All-Star Game
 Jim Pollard, NBA All-Star Game

References

Los Angeles Lakers seasons
Minneapolis
Minnesota Lakers
Minnesota Lakers